Antonia Mary Prebble (born 6 June 1984) is a New Zealand actress, best known for her role as Loretta West in the hit NZ comedy-drama Outrageous Fortune, as Trudy in The Tribe, as Jane in The Blue Rose, and as Rita West, the grandmother of her character in Outrageous Fortune, on the prequel series Westside. Internationally she's best known for her role as Clare Langtree, the Gatekeeper in the 2006 series Power Rangers Mystic Force.

Early life and education
Born on 6 June 1984 in Wellington, New Zealand, Antonia Mary Prebble is the middle of three children of John Prebble, a Sussex-born barrister and solicitor and a law professor at Victoria University of Wellington, and Nicola Mary Riddiford, an English teacher; Prebble has an older sister, Becky, and a younger brother, Ben, both of whom studied law. Her uncle Richard Prebble is a former politician, her uncle Mark Prebble is the former head of the State Services Commission, and her uncle Tom Prebble was a university administrator and professor emeritus.

Prebble attended Queen Margaret College between 1999 and 2001 and was Prefect in charge of Arts and Proxime Accessit in her final year. She then matriculated to Victoria University of Wellington, where she studied a Bachelor of Arts in Linguistics. Initially, Prebble had been studying for a Bachelor of Laws before she switched programs.

Prebble speaks fluent French.

Career
Prebble became interested in acting at an early age, starring in the stage play The Magical Kingdom of Thingymijig in 1993. In the late 1990s she started to work a lot with New Zealand children's TV production companies, with starring and guest roles in several programmes. Her roles included Mandy McFarlane in the second season of Mirror, Mirror in 1997, and Trudy in five series' of The Tribe from 1999 to 2003. She also guest starred in two episodes of Power Rangers: Dino Thunder as Krista, alongside two of her fellow cast members from The Tribe. In 2006, she began her role in Power Rangers: Mystic Force as Clare Langtree, the Gatekeeper and Udonna's apprentice.

Prebble made a cameo appearance in the band Flip Grater's music video for "Careful" and hosted New Zealand's WNTV (What Now Television) from 2002 to 2003.

In 2005, she was cast in the new New Zealand comedy-drama Outrageous Fortune as 15-year-old movie buff Loretta West. At the end of the fifth series, Loretta married Hayden Peters (played by Shane Cortese), her partner and the father of her child. In February 2010, filming wrapped for the sixth and final series. By this time, Loretta West had become a smart and successful business entrepreneur and a madame of a brothel. The final episode of the series aired 9 November 2010.

Prebble had a cameo role in the TVNZ series The Almighty Johnsons as a red-herring for the identity of the Norse goddess, Frigg in the show's first season in 2011. The real 'Frigg' was eventually played by Siobhan Marshall, Prebble's former co-star and on-screen sister on Outrageous Fortune.

Prebble and Marshall teamed up again in 2013 for a mystery thriller series, The Blue Rose.

In 2015 she had the lead role of Rita West in Westside, a prequel to Outrageous Fortune, playing the grandmother (as a young woman) of her character from the original series.

Prebble has given birth on screen five times, starting with The Tribe as a 14-year old, then Outrageous Fortune, a short film, White Lies, and a play as Mary mother of Jesus (who just popped out .... and we all sang a song).

Since 2016, Antonia has been an ambassador for New Zealand department store Smith & Caughey's. Prebble was the face of Smith & Caughey's Spring 2018 campaign and lookbook, photographed and styled in a series of images by fashion photographer Nicole Ku. Antonia Prebble has featured on the covers of Next Magazine, Remix Magazine, Mindfood Style, and Fashion Quarterly.

In early 2019, Prebble frequented New Zealand TV show The Project after having her first child with Dan Musgrove. During the same year she featured in the music video for "Help You Now"  by Auckland band Alae.

In April 2020, Prebble participated in an Outrageous Fortune virtual greeting in the fight against the coronavirus pandemic.

On 19 November 2020, Prebble was the guest host on The Project before the final episode of Westside.

In November 2022, Prebble joined the cast of Shortland Street as Dr Rebekah Anderson.

Personal life 
In 2016, Prebble began dating her then Westside co-star, Dan Musgrove. The couple announced their engagement in July 2018 and pregnancy in February 2019. They have two children together. Prebble lives in Auckland.

Filmography

Film

Television

See also
 List of New Zealand television personalities

References

External links
 Antonia Prebble website
 
 

1984 births
Living people
New Zealand child actresses
New Zealand film actresses
New Zealand people of English descent
New Zealand television actresses
New Zealand television presenters
Actresses from Wellington City
Victoria University of Wellington alumni
People educated at Queen Margaret College, Wellington
20th-century New Zealand actresses
21st-century New Zealand actresses
New Zealand women television presenters